is a Japanese footballer. He is a striker.

He was educated at and played for Albirex Niigata U18 before moving to Singapore.

Club career

Albirex Niigata (S) 

He signed for Albirex Niigata FC (Singapore) from the S.League in 2016 and also played for the under-15 and under-17 Japanese national teams. In 2018, he embarked on a week-long trial with their parent club in Japan. He renewed his contract with the White Swans for the 2019 season.

Fukui United FC

He signed for Fukui United FC after leaving Albirex Niigata (S) in 2021.

Club career statistics
As of 3 Sept 2022

References

External links
 

1997 births
Living people
Japanese footballers
Singapore Premier League players
Albirex Niigata Singapore FC players
Association football forwards